Endoclita jianglingensis is a species of moth of the family Hepialidae. It is known from Hubei, China.

References

External links
Hepialidae genera

Moths described in 1991
Hepialidae